The 2007–08 Belmont Bruins men's basketball team represented Belmont University during the 2007–08 NCAA Division I men's basketball season. The Bruins, led by 22nd year head coach Rick Byrd, played their home games at the Curb Event Center and are members of the Atlantic Sun Conference. They finished the season 25–9, 14–2 in A-Sun play to win the regular season conference championship. They also were champions of the 2008 Atlantic Sun men's basketball tournament to earn an automatic bid to the NCAA tournament. As No. 15 seed in the West region, the Bruins lost to No. 2 seed Duke by a single point, 71–70.

Roster

Schedule and results

|-
!colspan=9 style=| Regular season

|-
!colspan=9 style=| Atlantic Sun tournament

|-
!colspan=9 style=| NCAA tournament

References

Belmont
Belmont Bruins men's basketball seasons
Belmont